State College Area High School, often referred to locally as "State High," is a public high school in State College, Pennsylvania, United States. It is the only public high school in the State College Area School District and is within walking distance of Penn State University. It is 5 minutes away from Mount Nittany Middle School, and 10 minutes away from "Dark Forest" Middle School.

Campus 
The high school, which includes north and south campus facilities totaling , is on the fringe of downtown State College, and spans Westerly Parkway.

South

Main Campus 
This building serves as State High’s main campus.

Original South Building 
The original South Building was built in 1962 and had undergone numerous renovations. This original part of the building was single story and included classrooms along with the auditorium, gymnasium, cafeteria and main office area. In 1965, a single story addition was built, but due to grade changes on the site it operates as a second level. This addition included classrooms, the Library and the fitness center. Another classroom wing was built in 1999. Some aspects of the Career and Technical Center program were also included in the South High School. The building, which had also been a junior high school and then an intermediate high school, was demolished to make room for the new state-of-the-art  main campus facility.

North

Building 
The buildout renovated the school building and added additional turf athletic fields where the North Building once stood.

Original North Building 
The original North Building was built in 1955 and had undergone numerous renovations. The building's original portion, centered around the Logan Avenue entrance, was two-story and included classrooms along with the auditorium, two gymnasia, one cafeteria, library and main office area. In 1965, a two-story classroom addition was built parallel to Westerly Parkway. In 1989, the natatorium and a new gymnasium were added to the building. An additional classroom wing was constructed in 1999. Some aspects of the Career and Technology Center program were also included in the North High School. The building was demolished in 2018-19 to make room for a new  facility.

Delta Program 
The Delta Program is an alternative secondary school associated with State High. Students are encouraged to use community resources and can take classes from the high school, Delta, and Penn State. Delta Students enjoy small class sizes, mixed grade levels, and a set of freedoms which are typically restricted to college-age learning. To encourage a unity between teachers and students, teachers are referred to on a first name basis. The program also opened a middle level program, which proved to be quite popular.
 Community service is an important aspect of the Delta experience. Each year a student has to maintain 30 hours annually to stay within the Delta Community.
 Students, parents, and advisors meet regularly to discuss academic progress and set new goals. These meetings allow the teachers and parents one-on-one time with the student to discuss achievements as well as any problems the student may be having.
 Students are allowed open campus and are free to leave the Delta building during their lunch and free periods. Many students walk downtown, which is only a few minutes away from the school.

Driver's education 
In 1932, Amos Neyhart, assistant professor at Penn State University, began the country's first driver's education in-car course at State College Area High School. The program was altered after the 2010–2011 school year due to budget cuts from the new school board, which removed the course's behind-the-wheel component.

Notable alumni

Academia 
Harry Atwater – professor of applied physics and materials science at Caltech
Francis Fukuyama – political scientist, author of The End of History and the Last Man
Charles Myers – former labor economist, author, and professor

Athletics 
Stan Belinda – former Major League Baseball pitcher
Ryan Gruhn –  martial artist and MMA coach
Larry Johnson Jr. – former Penn State Football running back, played most recently for the Miami Dolphins, brother of Tony Johnson, son of Larry Johnson
Tony Johnson – former Penn State Football player, brother of Larry Johnson Jr., son of Larry Johnson
David Kimball – former NFL and NFL Europe placekicker
Rob Koll – head wrestling coach at Stanford University, son of Bill Koll
Butch Leitzinger – professional race car driver in the American Le Mans Series
Gabe Norwood – former NCAA basketball player, currently playing in the professional PBA league, brother of Jordan Norwood
Jordan Norwood – former NFL wide receiver, former Penn State Football wide receiver, brother of Gabe Norwood
Barry Parkhill – former American Basketball Association shooting guard, brother of Bruce Parkhill
Bruce Parkhill – former head college men's basketball coach, brother of Barry Parkhill
Jay Paterno – author, former football coach, son of Joe Paterno
Matt Rhule – head football coach at the University of Nebraska
Matt Suhey – former fullback for the Chicago Bears, former Penn State Football running back, son of Steve Suhey

Business & Politics 
Kerry Benninghoff – member of the Pennsylvania House of Representatives from the 171st Legislative District
Galen Dreibelbis – real estate developer, former member of the Pennsylvania House of Representatives
Herman Fisher – co-founder of Fisher-Price
Bill Welch – former mayor of State College

Arts & Communications 
Ian Hendrickson-Smith – jazz saxophonist with Sharon Jones and the Dap-Kings and The Roots
Laura Secor - American journalist whose work has focused on Iranian Politics and Iran-US relations.  Her work is regularly featured in The New Yorker.
Doug Sweetland – Annie-award-winning Pixar animator
 John Taylor – lead guitarist and musical director for the Jonas Brothers

References

External links 
 

High schools in Central Pennsylvania
Eastern Pennsylvania Rugby Union
Educational institutions established in 1894
Schools in Centre County, Pennsylvania
Public high schools in Pennsylvania
1894 establishments in Pennsylvania